Colin Yukes (born October 23, 1979 in Edmonton, Alberta) is a Canadian rugby player.

He has represented Canada 27 times including at the 2003 Rugby World Cup.
Colin started his rugby career with the Strathcona Druids, Sherwood Park, AB, Canada.  He now plays professionally with SU Agen Lot-et-Garonne, in France.

External links 
Scrum.Com

1979 births
Living people
Canada international rugby union players
Canadian expatriate sportspeople in France
Canadian expatriate rugby union players
Canadian rugby union players
Expatriate rugby union players in France
Sportspeople from Edmonton